"Analyse" is a song by the English musician Thom Yorke from his debut solo album, The Eraser (2006). It was released on 30 October, 2006, as a download and on 6 November as a limited edition 12" single in the United Kingdom.

Writing
"Analyse" was inspired by a blackout in Yorke's hometown of Oxford. Yorke said:

Release 
"Analyse" features in the closing credits of Christopher Nolan's 2006 film The Prestige. A remix was released by Various Production, which Yorke described on the Radiohead blog as "a deranged twist".

Track listing 
12" XLT252
"Analyse" – 4:05
"A Rat's Nest" – 3:35
"Iluvya" – 2:59

References

External links
theeraser.net
Thom Yorke page at the XL Recordings website.
Analyse page at the XL Recordings website.
"Analyse" at MusicBrainz

2006 songs
2006 singles
Thom Yorke songs
XL Recordings singles
Songs written by Thom Yorke
Song recordings produced by Nigel Godrich

ro:Analyse (melodie)